Syd Hall may refer to:

Syd Hall (footballer born 1879), Australian rules footballer for Essendon
Syd Hall (footballer born 1902), Australian rules footballer for Geelong

See also
Sydney Hall (disambiguation)
Sidney Hall, engraver